Taylor Dent was the defending champion but lost in the first round to Jan-Michael Gambill.

Joachim Johansson won in the final 7–6(7–5), 6–3 against Nicolas Kiefer.

Seeds

  Andy Roddick (quarterfinals)
  Mardy Fish (semifinals)
  Taylor Dent (first round)
  Robby Ginepri (first round)
  Vince Spadea (first round)
  James Blake (second round)
  Wayne Ferreira (second round)
  Nicolas Kiefer (final)

Draw

Finals

Top half

Bottom half

References
 2004 Kroger St. Jude International Draw

Singles
2004 ATP Tour